Teoria równoległych wszechświatów (pol. The Theory of Parallel Universes) is a debut album by Polish rapper Medium (currently known as Tau) released on November 21, 2011 by Asfalt Records. The album was entirely rapped, produced and arranged by Medium except three remixes exclusively released on an LP edition which were produced by Qciek, O.S.T.R. and Emade respectively.

The album received positive opinions both from listeners and reviewers who praised Medium's way of using various samples and ability to build "wide sound".

Despite a little advertising campaign Teoria równoległych wszechświatów has sold eight thousand copies and Polish hip-hop portal conferred Medium the title of "revelation of the year".

Track listing 
All songs were produced and arranged by Medium.

References

External links 
 Teoria równoległych wszechświatów at Discogs

2011 albums
Polish-language albums
Tau albums
Albums produced by Tau